Pseudolycopodiella caroliniana, known as slender bog club-moss, is a species of lycophyte in the family Lycopodiaceae. The genus Pseudolycopodiella is accepted in the Flora of North America and the Pteridophyte Phylogeny Group classification of 2016 (PPG I), but not in other classifications, which submerge the genus in Lycopodiella. The species has a discontinuous distribution, being native to the eastern United States (Alabama, Arkansas, Delaware, Florida, Georgia, Louisiana, Maryland, Massachusetts, Mississippi, New Jersey, New York, North Carolina, Pennsylvania, South Carolina, Texas and Virginia) and to parts of eastern Asia (Sri Lanka, Southeast China, Peninsula Malaysia and Japan).

References

Lycopodiaceae
Flora of the Northeastern United States
Flora of the Southeastern United States
Flora of Texas
Flora of Sri Lanka
Flora of Peninsular Malaysia
Flora of Japan
Flora without expected TNC conservation status